True is the third studio album by English new wave band Spandau Ballet, released on 4 March 1983 by Chrysalis Records. The band's songwriter/guitarist Gary Kemp realised after the release of their second album that the nightclub audience they initially wanted to attract had lost interest in them in part because of the band's transition from dance music to pop. He no longer felt obligated to keep writing music for them and shifted his focus to soul and R&B influences such as Marvin Gaye and Al Green for this album. Kemp thought that bandmate Steve Norman's newfound interest in the saxophone would be well-suited to the sound he was going for, as would the decision to record most of the album at Compass Point Studios in the Bahamas.

After an unsuccessful attempt to begin work on the album with producer Trevor Horn, the band tested out their working relationship with Tony Swain and Steve Jolley while recording its first single, "Lifeline", and chose to produce the album alongside them. "Lifeline" was a top ten hit on the UK Singles Chart, and its follow-up, "Communication", also did well. The album became available as the second single climbed the charts, and the overwhelming response to the title track dictated its release as the third single from the album, leading it to four weeks as the most popular song in the UK. It also became their first song to appear on the Billboard Hot 100 in the US, where it peaked at number four. A fourth single, "Gold", reached number two in the UK but only got as high as 29 in the US, which Kemp attributed to internal conflicts at their record label that took time away from promoting the band.

On the album charts, True reached number one in the UK and number 19 in the US while also having success in numerous other countries. It achieved platinum certification for sales of 300,000 units in the UK less than three months after its release. Most critics thought the album was enjoyable, but there were those who found something or much to dislike. The choice of suits for the album photos and "True" music video was thought to have misled US audiences by presenting them as too clean cut to have much else to offer other than soul ballads like the title song.

Background, development and recording

When Spandau Ballet first formed, their guitarist/songwriter Gary Kemp had been aware of how previous generations of Britain's youth culture had bands representing them, such as the Mods having The Who and Small Faces. He wanted people to associate Spandau with the fashion-wise clientele of a popular Tuesday night London gathering called the Blitz, and had written songs that sounded like what was played there, what he described as "white European dance music".

Their first album, Journeys to Glory, was a successful culmination of this style of material that Kemp had written at his own pace and that had been tested in front of the Blitz crowd over an extended period of time, but coming up with songs for their second effort, Diamond, was more challenging. Although following a renewed interest in funk gave them a number 3 UK hit with its first single, "Chant No. 1 (I Don't Need This Pressure On)", the writer's block Kemp suffered as it climbed the UK Singles Chart resulted in his mimicking its use of horns and group vocals for the next single, "Paint Me Down", which had a number 30 showing in the UK, the lowest peak position there of any of their singles to date. An experiment with the eastern European sound from American film scores for the third single, "She Loved Like Diamond", fared even worse just as Diamond was about to be released; that inspired the idea to take another song from the album, "Instinction", and hire a new producer to remix it in the hope that it would perform better. Kemp described that track as being the closest thing to a pop song that Spandau Ballet had yet recorded. The band hired Buggles founder Trevor Horn to do the new arrangement of the song, which reached number ten in the UK and made Kemp realise that the clubgoers they had initially catered to were no longer interested in their music. He was now able to write songs without concern for their danceability or adherence to current tastes. In his autobiography I Know This Much: From Soho to Spandau, he explained, "The freedom of not having to write just for Soho meant I could dive into that great big reservoir of pop, deep with melody and soul, and hopefully surface with the pearls I wanted."

Because of the rebound the band experienced with Horn's reworking of "Instinction", the plan was to have him produce the next album. He was especially impressed with one of Kemp's recent compositions, "Pleasure", and wanted to start working with the band on it immediately. The rehearsal went well, and they began recording it at AIR Studios with the mindset that it would be the first single from the new album, which was initially called The Pleasure Project. On the first day of recording, however, Horn had drummer John Keeble redo the track repeatedly over the course of the ten-hour day to try to get it perfect and called Kemp that evening to offer to programme the drums and suggest that they get a new drummer. Kemp was stunned by the suggestion: "I heard myself saying that programming the drums would not just be psychologically wrong for our team spirit, but it would also undermine John as a player." He refused Horn, who decided not to continue working with them. Later in 1982 Kemp told Smash Hits magazine, "We couldn't have worked with Trevor because he was too overpowering, too dogmatic."

The band's manager, Steve Dagger, suggested producers Tony Swain and Steve Jolley, who recently had success with Bananarama, and Kemp performed some of the songs he had just written for the duo with the plan of having them produce the first single from the new album to see if they had a good working relationship with the band. While Swain was leaning toward "Communication" as the best choice for their next hit song, Jolley insisted that they work on the "up-tempo, more obvious pop sing-along" "Lifeline". The band was credited alongside Jolley and Swain as producers of "Lifeline" and would be on the album as well.

"Lifeline" was recorded at Red Bus Studios in Paddington as Spandau Ballet got a feel for their new producers, but they worked on the rest of the album at Compass Point Studios in the Bahamas because of the soul music that had been recorded there and because Kemp felt that the tropical surroundings would help give the music the feeling he was trying to achieve. The band rehearsed before they travelled there, and lead singer Tony Hadley recorded his vocals at Red Bus upon their return.

Songs

In a Mastertapes interview with John Wilson in 2013, Kemp contrasted the anti-establishment, anticommercial stance of the punk scene with the plan that Spandau Ballet initially had of having similar attitudes in their dress and style of music but selling enough records to make the pop charts at the same time. He felt that their appearances on the British music chart television programme Top of the Pops contributed to their assimilation into a more mainstream sound and explained that, because of his realisation that their music no longer interested the nightclub crowd after the release of "Instinction", "There was a sense of, 'We have to move on from here.'" He told Wilson how their desire to expand to a broader audience inspired the "True" lyric "I bought a ticket to the world". In 2012 he told The Guardian, "We were leaving the London club scene and starting to sell records around the world, so the next album really needed to be pop."

In 1981 the band recorded "Chant No. 1" with the British jazz-funk group Beggar and Co acting as their horn section, and Steve Norman, who had been the band's guitarist and percussionist on its first two albums, subsequently felt inspired to take up the saxophone. Kemp recalled he and Norman enjoying hearing the instrument as teenagers on songs by Smokey Robinson and Stevie Wonder as well as the hit "Shame" by Evelyn "Champagne" King. Kemp decided that their foray into pop on the new album would use the saxophone in the same vein as the soul music they enjoyed growing up. Once he found this new direction for their music, he suddenly had the urge to write several songs. In an early 1983 interview with Record Mirror magazine, he confessed feeling that the songs for this album were the best that he had ever written and explained that he went back to writing what sounded good with just an acoustic guitar. He discussed the difficulty of trying to focus on more personal subjects without sounding derivative and how he had overcome his fear of being honest in his music. He said, "I honestly wanted to make an album that would cross all ages and become timeless. I said to Tony Swain, 'I like Daryl Hall and John Oates, and I want the album to sound as smooth as that but with a British edge to it.' I think it's got that."

"True"
In 1981, Kemp met Altered Images lead singer Clare Grogan and, despite already having a girlfriend, found himself infatuated with her because of their common interests. By the time he started writing songs for the album, he was primarily listening to music by Marvin Gaye and Al Green and wanted to write a blue-eyed soul version of their style of music that was based on his own experience. Grogan had given him a copy of the novel Lolita by Vladimir Nabokov as a gift, so he incorporated a couple of phrases he had underlined while reading it into the lyrics – "pill on my tongue" and "seaside limbs", which became "seaside arms" – in order to convey his feelings in a way that she would recognise. He told Wilson he was still getting questioned about the meaning of "seaside arms" or criticised for his paraphrasing of the expression.

"Gold"
Once Kemp decided to start writing pop songs, the first idea he chose to explore was paying homage to film scores as he had attempted on "She Loved Like Diamond", only this time focusing specifically on John Barry and his work on the James Bond series. The title of the song, "Gold", was inspired by Shirley Bassey's 1964 hit Bond theme "Goldfinger". Because he and his brother, Martin, who was the bassist for the band, were still living with their parents as he began writing songs for the album, it was convenient to have his brother listen to what he had just written and play it with him on his bass to see if it sounded like what he intended, and this song was one Martin loved.

Cover art
Kemp was competing for Grogan's attention with Altered Images cover artist David Band and asked him to work with Spandau Ballet on the design for the new album. Because they were both seeing their careers take off during their attempts to court Grogan, they went camping together a few times in the English Lake District as a way of escaping their success. Kemp recalled, "We first started to devise a cover together for the True album when we were up in the mountains, in one of the pubs one evening. He was drawing in his sketchbook and a dove appeared, this little dove." Band later added alongside it the outline of a man's head with a brimmed hat, which the band loved; a variation was used for the sleeve of the "True" single. His work was described as "a marker for the look of the time, a jazz-influenced style that could also be seen in an exaggerated fashion in the New Romantic look." Kemp credits him with having "the skill of coming up with simple, figurative graphics that would set a visual tone for the decade." In 2012 he told The Herald:

Release and commercial performance
True was released on 4 March 1983 and received silver certification from the British Phonographic Industry on 9 March for reaching the 60,000 units of shipment threshold. It entered the UK Albums Chart on 12 March to begin a chart run of 90 weeks, one of which was at number 1. Gold certification for reaching 100,000 units was issued on 11 April, and platinum (300,000 units) came the following month on 23 May. It also reached the top spot in the Netherlands and New Zealand and performed well in other countries. In the US, the album debuted on Billboard magazine's Top LPs & Tapes chart in the issue dated 14 May 1983 and peaked at number 19 during a 37-week run.

To commemorate its 20th anniversary, a remastered version of "True" was released on 29 April 2003 as a single CD with the original eight tracks along with the music video for "Gold" and some home video footage of the band.  The original 8-track album was also issued in 2003 on the high-resolution super audio CD format as a Hybrid SACD (in stereo only). In 2008, the album was given away free with copies of the Daily Mail newspaper.{{efn|"In September 2008 the Daily Mail came up with the ultimate promotion. On twelve consecutive days they gave away an original 80s album. It started off with Spandau Ballet's True''…"}} In June 2010, a special edition was released on 2 CDs with a DVD as part of the 2010 Spandau Ballet reissues series, featuring remastered 12″ remixes and B-sides, plus a live concert.

Critical receptionBillboard magazine gave the album a positive review upon its release in the US, noting that "Pleasure" and "Code of Love" "linger with the fresh feel of new music while owing to swing era rhythms, even MOR." Most reviewers at the time, however, qualified their praise. Parke Puterbaugh of Rolling Stone magazine wrote, "You can shut your eyes while listening to True and almost imagine that Spandau Ballet has had nothing to do with clothes, makeup or any fashion-show pseudoevents" and concluded that the album was "a sleekly executed, surprisingly affecting record, and welcome proof that bunch of clotheshorses can place high in the musical stakes, too." Don Mackay of Rip It Up also summed up his comments with a reference to their vestiary history: "While still some distance short of profundity, the result is generally pleasant enough with tracks like 'Communication', 'Lifeline' and 'Foundation' at least proving that the Ballet really can dance. Perhaps there's life in the old clotheshorses yet." Trouser Press magazine's Ira Robbins also counted "Communication" and "Lifeline" as album highlights, adding, "The remaining six cuts aren't as noteworthy, but at least aren't objectionable or off-putting." Dave Rimmer of Smash Hits conceded that "there's nothing here as awful as, say, '[She Loved Like] Diamond', but on the other hand nothing as brilliant as 'Chant No. 1'. True is less interesting than previous Spandau LPs, but much more enjoyable." Record Mirror's Betty Page warned,Enter into True with a mind truly free of preconceptions, and you'll wallow in a chunk of creamy, dreamy funk with satisfyingly rounded edges. Turn a cynical eye to who you're dealing with and where they've come from and you'll find plenty of cannon fodder.

Gavin Martin of the New Musical Express wrote a long, scathing review of the album, which he opened by describing the band as "slimy" and "ingratiating" with "opportunist, vaguely plagiaristic whims and indulgences". He called the album "milksop funk pap", "bland feckless goo" and "doleful emasculation". Regarding Kemp's songwriting, he wrote,Despite all the talk of inner strength and celebrations of the highlife elsewhere, the music is stale and rigid with a backline that fairly grinds along where it should be bright and alert.
As a pop band Spandau are too pedestrian, too tied up in their own self-important world to provide a sharp/indignant/imaginative insight to the times; and as a "soul" band, well, they're fooling no one.

Retrospective reviews were mixed. Paul Evans wrote a brief summary review of most of their album discography in The Rolling Stone Album Guide and gave True three stars out of five without much to recommend. At his most complimentary, he opined, "Tony Hadley developed a way of vocalizing that joined the heavy dramatics of Bryan Ferry to the lounge act 'feeling' of a Gary Puckett or a bad Bobby Darin." Of all their albums, he concluded, "True remains creepily fascinating." Dan LeRoy of AllMusic complimented "the growing skill of guitarist Gary Kemp, the band's primary songwriter, who crafted a set of tunes aimed squarely at the charts." Like Rimmer, however, he did not find anything as interesting as their previous UK hits:Some listeners at the time called the album an MOR sellout, but its slick surfaces remain tough to resist, and while none of the cuts generate the excitement of past singles like "To Cut a Long Story Short" or "Chant No. 1," True remains Spandau Ballet's most consistent and best all-around album.

Singles and videos
Swain and Jolley's selection for their tryout as producers, "Lifeline", became the first single released from the album and debuted on the UK Singles Chart dated 2 October 1982. It peaked at number 7 during its 9 weeks there and reached the pop charts in other countries. In the US, it was paired with "Communication" when it appeared on Billboard magazine's Dance/Disco Top 80 chart. The US chart appearances coincided with the airing of the music video on MTV in the spring of 1983. Critics were divided, with some finding it bland and others appreciating the R&B-style vocals.

The album was completed in December 1982, but Kemp explained that when the next single needed to be chosen, the band's manager, Steve Dagger, "didn't want to go with a ballad next and recommended another up-tempo first. 'Communication' got the band vote. Why we didn't go straight for 'True' or 'Gold' as the next single, I'm not sure. Maybe we felt their success would be automatic and wanted to save them for later, during the album's release." "Communication" debuted on the UK Singles Chart on 12 February 1983 and reached number 12 over the course of 10 weeks. It also charted in other countries, and, in addition to its dance chart pairing with "Lifeline" in the US in the spring of 1983, it made the Billboard Hot 100 in the spring of 1984, after "True" and "Gold", the third and fourth singles from the album, completed their chart runs there. Reviews were mostly good; some critics complimented Hadley's vocals and appreciated what they felt was a scaled-back approach, but others still found it overdone. The music video for the song was made to look like a theatrical film, and, in order to increase his visibility, Hadley was the only band member to appear in it.

The title song began 15 weeks on the UK Singles Chart in April 1983 and spent four weeks at number one. It also went to the top spot in Canada and Ireland and made the top ten in several other countries, including the US, where it got as high as number four on the Hot 100 and spent a week at number one on Billboard's Adult Contemporary chart. It received a variety of responses from critics, with some finding it flawless and others disliking it. Hadley felt that their choice to wear suits for the music video had given their US audience a misleading first impression since "True" was very different from the hits they had elsewhere.

"Gold" was the fourth UK single from the album and spent nine weeks on the pop chart there, two of which were at number two. Although it made the top ten in several other countries, it only got as high as number 29 in the US. The music video alternated shots of the band performing the song with a storyline in which Hadley played a character who wandered the sun-baked streets and outskirts of Carmona, Spain, searching for pieces that made up a gold puzzle. Critics were again in disagreement as some showed appreciation, others contempt.

Chrysalis wanted to release "Heaven Is a Secret" as a fifth single in the UK; however the band refused this. In limited European release at the end of 1983, "Pleasure" reached number 27 in the Netherlands, number 32 in Belgium, and number 61 in West Germany. In reviews of the album, "Pleasure" elicited the same divided response as some of the previous singles. Page described it as "smoothly mournful", but Martin used the song's lyrics as an example of Kemp "attempting to present characters that are strong and noble with dignity and high moral purpose", concluding, "Even [Spandau Ballet's] leisure time becomes a virtual religious experience."

Aftermath
The number 29 showing by "Gold" in the US was the first signal to Kemp that Chrysalis America was not promoting them. "Communication" only reached number 59 in the US in 1984, and "Only When You Leave", the first single from their next album, Parade, became their last Hot 100 entry when it peaked at number 34 later that year. Kemp was unhappy with those performances as well and blamed the low numbers on a perceived conflict between Chrysalis founders Chris Wright and Terry Ellis distracting them from promotional efforts. Wright refused to license the band to a bigger label in the US, so they sought legal advice to get out of their contract. The disappointing chart performance in the US led Spandau Ballet to leave Chrysalis for CBS Records, which released their Parade follow-up, Through the Barricades, in 1986.

Hadley felt that the band's inability to sustain the interest of the American public resulted from a few other factors working against them, primarily that their big US hit was very different to what they had already succeeded with elsewhere. Kemp had said in an interview before "Gold"'s US release that he hoped it would give Americans a more balanced view of Spandau Ballet. Although some American concert attendees knew their old songs, he hoped their upcoming US tour would show the rest who came that "True" was not the sort of song they normally did.

In retrospect, however, Hadley felt they needed to spend several months touring the US so that more audiences could hear that back catalogue and not doing so also hurt their record sales there. They played "True" at the 1985 Live Aid concert, but instead of using their brief time on stage to showcase one of their earlier hits, Dagger wanted them to play "Virgin" from their upcoming Through the Barricades album, which even Kemp admitted was not a good idea. Hadley felt Dagger was inexperienced, but whenever he suggested getting a manager with more knowledge about the business, the rest of the band balked.

Kemp told Creem in 1984 that he would continue to write for the larger audience Spandau Ballet had acquired with "True" but it would not be making albums that sounded like the last just because it did well. But, just as he had developed writer's block in 1981 after "Chant No. 1" became their highest-charting single, having a UK number one put pressure on Kemp to churn out more chart-topping hits and left him feeling that the band would always judge his future output against "True". When the Through the Barricades'' album and its singles failed to chart in the US, Kemp chided himself for exploring so many genres and not simply trying to write more hit songs that were imitations of "True".

Track listing

Personnel

Spandau Ballet
 Tony Hadley – lead and backing vocals
 Gary Kemp – guitars, backing vocals
 Martin Kemp – bass
 John Keeble – drums
 Steve Norman – percussion, saxophone

Additional musician
 Jess Bailey – keyboards

Technical
 Spandau Ballet – production
 Steve Jolley – production 
 Tony Swain – production, engineering
 Richard Lengyel – engineering assistance
 Tim Young – mastering
 David Band – art direction, illustration
 Lynn Goldsmith – photography
 Stephen Horsfall – typography
 Mixed at Red Bus Studios (London)
 Mastered at CBS Studios (London)

Charts

Weekly charts

Year-end charts

Certifications

Notes

References

Bibliography

1983 albums
Albums produced by Jolley & Swain
Chrysalis Records albums
Spandau Ballet albums